Country-wide local elections for seats in municipality and county councils were held throughout Norway on 15 September 2003. For most places this meant that two elections, the municipal elections and the county elections ran concurrently. In addition, several municipalities held direct mayoral elections.

Term of office for the elected politicians was 1 January 2004 until 31 December 2007.

Results

Municipal elections
Results of the 2003 municipal elections. Voter turnout was 58,8%.

County elections

Results of the 2003 county elections. Voter turnout was 55,1%.

References

2003
2003
Norway
2003 in Norway
September 2003 events in Europe